Percnarcha trabeata is a moth in the family Gelechiidae. It was described by Edward Meyrick in 1909. It is found in Bolivia.

References

Gelechiinae
Moths described in 1909
Taxa named by Edward Meyrick